Anthony Dean (born 22 April 1991) is an Australian BMX cyclist. He qualified for the 2016 RIO Olympics & The 2020 Tokyo Olympics and competed in the men's BMX Racing.

Early years 
Born in Adelaide, South Australia, Dean first started competing in BMX as a 7-year-old. He was very focused and with intense practice excelled in the National Series and National Championships. 

In 2013, Dean got his first chance at competing on the World Circuit. In 2014 he achieved his first World Cup medal and finished second overall in the World Cup rankings.

Achievements 
Dean was nominated as a reserve for the London 2012 Olympics team, He climbed into the top ten in the world leading into the Rio 2016 Olympics. However, in early 2016 his Olympic dreams were almost shattered when he broke his collarbone during a training session. Fortunately, after surgery, he made a quick recovery. He was able to compete in the season's opening World Cup event.

At the Rio 2016 Olympics, Dean moved through the quarter-finals as the highest ranked rider. He won each of his three semi-final races and joined teammate Sam Willoughby in the final. Unfortunately Dean couldn't match his earlier feats and finished eighth.

Dean, originally from Australia, now presently lives in San Diego, California. Dean has been a top threat contender in the men's elite BMX since 2012. During the 2018 UCI BMX World Championships he became a recipient of the bronze medal.

Dean likes to listen hip hop and is influenced by Sam Willoughby.

References

External links
 
 
 
 
 
 Cycling Australia profile

1991 births
Living people
Australian male cyclists
BMX riders
Olympic cyclists of Australia
Cyclists at the 2016 Summer Olympics
Cyclists from Adelaide
Cyclists at the 2020 Summer Olympics